The Women's time trial H4 road cycling event at the 2012 Summer Paralympics took place on September 5 at Brands Hatch. six riders from five different nations competed. The race distance was 16 km.

Results

References

Women's road time trial H4
2012 in women's road cycling